PGC 39058 is a dwarf galaxy located 14 million light-years away in the constellation Draco. The galaxy is faint and obscured by HD 106381, a star in the foreground making it difficult to observe.

References

PGC 039058
039058
PGC 039058